Sir Solomon de Medina (ca.1650, Bordeaux – 15 September 1730, Amsterdam) was an army contractor for William III and the first Jew to be knighted in England.

Career
Solomon de Medina was a wealthy Jew who went with William III to England as an army contractor. In 1702 he returned to Amsterdam, from which point his son-in-law acted for him in London. He attained notability due to his extensive dealings with the English government of his day. "The Jew Medina," as he was popularly called, held a position of prominence in connection with the English forces. During the War of the Spanish Succession (1702–14) he accompanied John Churchill, 1st Duke of Marlborough on his campaigns, advanced him funds, and furnished provisions for the troops.

He also established a system of expresses which outstripped those of the government, so that his agents were in possession of important news before it reached the ministers of the Crown. His negotiations were made evident in an attack on the Duke of Marlborough in Parliament in 1711 for giving Medina a yearly payment of £6,000. Marlborough replied that the money had been expended in obtaining trustworthy information. It was said of Medina that every British victory contributed as much to his wealth as to the glory of England.

For his services he was knighted in 1700,  the first Jew in England to receive that honour. Sir Solomon de Medina was at one time the largest contributor to the Bevis Marks Synagogue in London.

References

Sources
 Dictionary of National Biography
 Oxford Dictionary of National Biography

Further reading

External links
 Jacobs, Joseph; Lipkind, Goodman. Entry at Jewish Encyclopedia, 1906.

1650s births
1730 deaths
17th-century French Sephardi Jews
17th-century English Sephardi  Jews
18th-century British Sephardi Jews
English knights
Businesspeople from Bordeaux
People of the War of the Spanish Succession